Tingzhou may refer to : 
 Tingzhou, Longyan, a town in Changting County, Longyan City, Fujian Province 
 Tingzhou fu, a former prefecture in western Fujian 
 Roman Catholic Diocese of Tingzhou, in the Ecclesiastical province of Fuzhou
 Dingzhou, a county-level city in Hebei
 Tingzhou or Beiting, an ancient city in modern Jimsar County, Xinjiang